Chițcanii Vechi is a commune in Telenești District, Moldova. It is composed of two villages, Chițcanii Noi and Chițcanii Vechi.

Notable people
 Andrei Găină

References

Communes of Telenești District